Mandalay is the second largest city in Myanmar (Burma).

Mandalay may also refer to:

Places
 Mandalay, Queensland, a locality in the Whitsunday Region, Australia
 Mandalay Region, an administrative division of Myanmar
 Mandalay, Mitchells Plain, a neighborhood of Cape Town, South Africa

Arts and entertainment
 Mandalay (film), a 1934 film directed by Michael Curtiz
 Mandalay (poem), an 1890 poem by Rudyard Kipling
 Mandalay: Recipes and Tales from a Burmese Kitchen, a 2019 cookbook by MiMi Aye
 Mandalay (band), a 1995–2002 British trip hop group
 "Mandalay", a song by Gerard Francis Cobb, based on Kipling's poem
 "Mandalay", a 1990 song by Electric Light Orchestra from Afterglow
 "Way to Mandalay", a 2003 song by Blackmore's Night from Ghost Of A Rose

Other uses
 Mandalay (TransMilenio), a bus station in Bogotá, Colombia
 Mandalay Pictures or Mandalay Vision, an American film production company
 SV Mandalay, a Danish-built American schooner

See also
 Manderlay, a 2005 film
 Manderley, a fictional estate in Daphne du Maurier's novel Rebecca